P. J. Hyett (born August 10, 1983) is an American software developer, technology entrepreneur, and a co-founder of GitHub, an Internet hosting service for software development and version control using Git, which he created with Tom Preston-Werner and Chris Wanstrath in 2008. In 2022 Hyett founded an auto racing team, AO Racing, an IMSA WeatherTech SportsCar Championship GT Daytona program, to compete in GTE races.

Hyett was born on August 10, 1983, and grew up in Naperville, Illinois. He earned a bachelor's degree in computer science from North Central College. After graduation, Hyett moved to San Francisco. He was a senior software engineer at CNET Networks, and then a partner at Err Free, before co-founding GitHub in 2008.

Following the acquisition of GitHub by Microsoft in June 2018, Hyett's stake in the company had an estimated value of "close to $1 billion".

Hyett is married, has a daughter, and lives in San Francisco.

Racing record

Racing career summary 

† As Hyett was a guest driver, he was ineligible to score championship points.

Complete FIA World Endurance Championship results
(key) (Races in bold indicate pole position; races in italics indicate fastest lap)

* Season still in progress.

Complete IMSA SportsCar Championship results
(key) (Races in bold indicate pole position)

References

Living people
American technology company founders
21st-century American businesspeople
GitHub people
North Central College alumni
People from Naperville, Illinois
GT World Challenge America drivers

Multimatic Motorsports drivers
Le Mans Cup drivers
FIA World Endurance Championship drivers
WeatherTech SportsCar Championship drivers
1983 births